The European and African Zone was one of the three zones of regional Davis Cup competition in 2003.

In the Europe/Africa Zone there were four different tiers, called groups, in which teams competed against each other to advance to the upper tier. Winners in Group I advanced to the World Group Play-offs, along with losing teams from the World Group first round. Teams who lost their respective ties competed in the relegation play-offs, with winning teams remaining in Group I, whereas teams who lost their play-offs were relegated to the Europe/Africa Zone Group II in 2004.

Participating teams

Seeds: 
 
 
 
 

Remaining nations:

Draw

 and  relegated to Group II in 2004.

First Round Matches

Norway vs. Austria

Belarus vs. Israel

Second Round Matches

Luxembourg vs. Slovakia

Austria vs. Finland

Belarus vs. Zimbabwe

Morocco vs. Italy

First Round Play-offs Matches

Norway vs. Finland

Israel vs. Zimbabwe

Second Round Play-offs Matches

Norway vs. Luxembourg

Zimbabwe vs. Italy

References

2003 Davis Cup Europe/Africa Zone
Davis Cup Europe/Africa Zone